The 2014 Mexican League season was the 90th season in the history of the Mexican League. It was contested by 16 teams, evenly divided in North and South zones. The season started on 3 April with the match between 2013 season champions Tigres de Quintana Roo and Diablos Rojos del México and ended on 11 September with the last game of the Serie del Rey, where the Diablos Rojos defeated Pericos de Puebla to win the championship.

For this season, Petroleros de Minatitlán was sold and moved to Tijuana to play as Toros de Tijuana.

Standings

Postseason

League leaders

Awards

References

Mexican League season
Mexican League season
Mexican League seasons